Sir John Ennis, 1st Baronet (1800 – 8 August 1878)  was an Irish Independent Irish and Liberal politician who sat in the House of Commons from 1857 to 1865, and was Governor of the Bank of Ireland.

Ennis was born in Dublin, the only son of Andrew Ennis and Mary McManus, and baptised 31 August 1800 at the Catholic Church of Saints Michael and John. He was educated at Stonyhurst Roman Catholic College.

In 1857, Ennis was elected Member of Parliament for Athlone for the Irish Independent Party. In 1859, he was re-elected as a Liberal and held the seat until 1865. Ennis was created a baronet in 1866. He lived at Ballinahown Court, Athlone. He died at the age of 69

Ennis married Anna Maria Henry, daughter of David Henry of Dublin. His only son, John, was also MP for Athlone and succeeded to the baronetcy.

References

External links
 

1800 births
1878 deaths
Baronets in the Baronetage of the United Kingdom
Politicians from County Roscommon
19th-century Irish people
Members of the Parliament of the United Kingdom for Athlone
Irish Liberal Party MPs
UK MPs 1857–1859
UK MPs 1859–1865